Wilfred is an unincorporated community in western Jackson Township, Sullivan County, in the U.S. state of Indiana.

The community is part of the Terre Haute Metropolitan Statistical Area.

History
Wilfred was founded in 1902 as a mining community. The town's name was derived from the names of two local mine operators, Wilford and Fredman.

Geography

References

Unincorporated communities in Sullivan County, Indiana
Unincorporated communities in Indiana
Terre Haute metropolitan area